Nasha Zhizn  (Our Life) was a liberal daily newspaper published in St. Petersburg, Russia, from November 19, 1904 to July 24, 1906, with some intervals.

References

Newspapers published in the Russian Empire
Publications established in 1904
1904 establishments in the Russian Empire
Mass media in Saint Petersburg